Brissopsis jarlii is a species of sea urchins of the family Brissidae. Their armour is covered with spines. Brissopsis jarlii was first scientifically described in 1951 by Ole Theodor Jensen Mortensen.

References 

Animals described in 1951
jarlii
Taxa named by Ole Theodor Jensen Mortensen